Manoranjan Das (23 July 1923 – 17 February 2013)  was an influential Indian dramatist, and pioneer of modernism in Odia Literature. He was known for his experimentalism and deep socio-political awareness, who became most known in the 1960s with his experimental theatre.

Amongst his most known work are, Kathagodha (The Wooden Horse) and Aranya Fasal (The Wild Harvest), which won him the Sahitya Akademi Award (1971). In a career spanning over four decades, his plays include Janmamati (Land of Birth)  written in 1943 and his latest Nandika Kesari which appeared in 1985.

Early life and education

Born in 1923 in a village (named "Patana,42-Mouza, Cuttack sadar") near Cuttack, he did his schooling in Kujang near Paradip, completing his intermediate in 1942. Thereafter he joined Ravenshaw College in Cuttack.

Career
He joined All India Radio where he rose to the level of Producer Emeritus. During his literary career, he has written 14 other plays, including Aranya Fasal (The Wild Harvest), which won him the Sahitya Akademi Award given Sahitya Akademi, India's National Academy of Letters in 1971, and the Padma Shri by Government of India in 2004.

His other plays are Jauban (Youth), August Na (The Ninth August 1947), Baxi Jagabandhu (The Sacrifice of Jagabandhu), Agami (The Oncoming), Abarodha (The Seize), Kathagodha (The Wooden Horse), and Sabdalipi (The Word-script).

Works
 Smriti samlap (autobiography). Friends Publishers, 1999; .
 Ten essays on poet, poetry and psychology. Future Publications, 2005.
 Aranya Fasal. Sahitya Akademi Publications, 2001; .

Works in translation
 The Wooden Horse: drama. Pub. Bookland International (1982)
 The Wild Harvest. Translated by Prabhat Nalini Das. Pub. Sahitya Akademi, 1993; 
 A game of words: a play. tr. by Bibhu Padhi, Guru Charan Behera. Pub. Prachi Prakashan, 1997; 
 A ray's rope. Pub. Ila Das, 1997.

 Nandika Keshari: (Sarala award winning play). tr by Prabhat Nalini Das. Prachi Prakashan (2000); 
 Afternoon flurries. Pub. Subarnarekha, 2002. 
 A dialogue with memory (autobiography). tr. by Aruna Kumar Mohanty & J. K. Nayak. National Book Trust, India, (2002);

Notes

References
 
 
 

1923 births
2013 deaths
People from Cuttack district
Indian male dramatists and playwrights
Odia-language writers
Odia dramatists and playwrights
Dramatists and playwrights from Odisha
Recipients of the Padma Shri in arts
Recipients of the Sahitya Akademi Award in Odia
Recipients of the Atibadi Jagannath Das Award
Recipients of the Odisha Sahitya Akademi Award
Recipients of the Sangeet Natak Akademi Award
20th-century Indian dramatists and playwrights
20th-century Indian male writers